Arrivano i Rossi is an Italian television series that is both a sitcom and Reality Television. It is based around a pretend family who invites the 'victim' into their home, which is full of hidden cameras.

See also
List of Italian television series

Italian television series
Italia 1 original programming